Maria Ragland Davis (June 1, 1959 – February 12, 2010) was an American biologist and educator. She was associate professor of Biology at the University of Alabama in Huntsville where she studied molecular biology and plant genetics.

Life and career
A native of Detroit, she received her undergraduate degree in chemical engineering from the University of Michigan and a master's degree in the same discipline from North Carolina State University. Following the receipt of her master's degree, Davis completed her doctorate in biochemistry and plant biology. Davis studied strawberries, looking at the genetic makeup of strains that were susceptible to fungal pathogens under cold stress and those that were not.

Death
She was one of three faculty members killed in the University of Alabama in Huntsville shooting on February 12, 2010. She was 50 years old.

Selected works
 Cold induced Botrytis cinerea enolase (BcEnol-1) functions as a transcriptional regulator and is controlled by cAMP. Molecular Genetics and Genomics Volume 281, Number 2. Ajay K. Pandey, Preti Jain, Gopi K. Podila, Bettina Tudzynski and Maria R. Davis.
 
 Comparative Proteomic Analysis of Botrytis cinerea Secretome. J. Proteome Res., 2009, 8 (3), pgs. 1123–30, Punit Shah, James A. Atwood, III, Ron Orlando, Hind El Mubarek, Gopi K. Podila and Maria R. Davis
 A First-Generation Whole Genome–Radiation Hybrid Map Spanning the Mouse Genome. Genome Res. 1997. 7: pgs. 1153–61. Linda C. McCarthy, Jonathan Terrett, Maria E. Davis, Catherine J. Knights, Angela L. Smith, Ricky Critcher, Karin Schmitt, Jim Hudson, Nigel K. Spurr, and Peter N. Goodfello

References

External links

 Mangan, Katherine and Karthyn Masterson. "Maria Ragland Davis, 52, Did Research to Help Developing Countries." The Chronicle of Higher Education. February 14, 2010.
 . (Archive) Department of Biological Sciences, UAH.
 Faculty in Biological Sciences, (Archive) UAHuntsville website

1959 births
2010 deaths
American geneticists
Scientists from Detroit
North Carolina State University alumni
University of Alabama in Huntsville faculty
People murdered in Alabama
Deaths by firearm in Alabama
American molecular biologists
Women molecular biologists
University of Michigan College of Engineering alumni
20th-century American women scientists
20th-century American scientists
American women academics
21st-century American women